Warren Alberto Granados Quesada (born December 6, 1981) is a Costa Rican professional footballer. As of 2009, he plays for Asociación Deportiva Ramonense.

Club career
Granados made his professional debut for second division Ramonense aged 16 and joined Alajuelense ahead of the 2002 season, signing for 4 years. In summer 2004 he moved to Puntarenas and in May 2005 he was on the losing end missing out on the Clausura season final as his side Cartaginés lost to Saprissa.

In July 2008, Granados returned to playing for Ramonense after quitting football to pick up computer studies and work outside football.

International career
Granados has played at the 2001 FIFA World Youth Championship and competed for Costa Rica at the 2004 Summer Olympics.

He made his senior debut for Costa Rica in a May 2009 friendly match against Venezuela and earned a total of 6 caps, scoring 2 goals including four appearances at the 2009 CONCACAF Gold Cup finals.

His final international was a July 2009 CONCACAF Gold Cup match against Mexico.

International goals
Scores and results list Costa Rica's goal tally first.

References

External links

1981 births
Living people
People from San Ramón, Costa Rica
Association football midfielders
Costa Rican footballers
Costa Rica international footballers
Olympic footballers of Costa Rica
Footballers at the 2004 Summer Olympics
2009 CONCACAF Gold Cup players
A.D. Ramonense players
L.D. Alajuelense footballers
Puntarenas F.C. players
C.S. Cartaginés players
Liga FPD players